was a Japanese rōkyoku and enka singer. He took part in the Kōhaku Uta Gassen 27 times.

He studied rōkyoku under one of Kumoemon Tochuken's disciples, Kumo Sakai.

His 1961 single "Ōshō" sold over one million copies. Along with Hachiro Kasuga and Michiya Mihashi, he became a famous enka singer and Haruo Minami was regarded as his rival. He died on June 13, 2002.

References

External links 
 
 Memorial Hall of Hideo Murata 

1929 births
2002 deaths
Enka singers
Nippon Columbia artists
Japanese racehorse owners and breeders
Musicians from Fukuoka Prefecture
20th-century Japanese male singers
20th-century Japanese singers
People from Ukiha, Fukuoka